Side A is the second EP by American artist Christina Grimmie. The album was released for digital download on February 21, 2016. The EP was produced by Maker Music and AwesomenessTV. Physical copies of the album were sold at Grimmie's tour appearances and shows. The EP was released independently and debuted at number 25 on the Billboard Independent Albums chart in the US. This marked her final release prior to her death on June 10, 2016. 

Four posthumous music videos were released two months after her death. All of them have been directed by King Hollis, while co-produced by AwesomenessTV and Media 13. The music videos also pay tribute to Christina herself. Furthermore, these are her only music videos not to have been co-produced by Maker Studios, after she was dropped due to still unknown reasons.

Before her death, Christina had already revealed plans to ultimately release a third EP, named Side B, and thus serving as the successor to the Side A EP. It has been released posthumously.

Track listing

Charts

Release history

References

2016 EPs
Christina Grimmie albums
Teen pop EPs